is a railway station on the Minobu Line of Central Japan Railway Company (JR Central) located in the city of Fuji, Shizuoka Prefecture, Japan.

Lines
Fujine Station is served by the Minobu Line and is located 8.0 kilometers from the southern terminus of the line at Fuji Station.

Layout
Fujine Station consists of a single island platform connected to the station building by a level crossing. The station building has automated ticket machines, automated turnstiles and has been unmanned since 1998.  A short shunt track from Track 1 allows for parking and storage of various maintenance of way equipment for the Minobu Line.

Platform

Adjacent stations

History
Fujine Station was opened on July 20, 1913, as one of the original Minobu Line stations for both passenger and freight services. It came under control of the Japanese Government Railway (JGR) on May 1, 1941. The JGR became the Japan National Railway (JNR) after World War II. Freight services were discontinued in 1972, the same year that the tracks from Fuji to Fujinomiya were expanded to a double track system. Along with the division and privatization of JNR on April 1, 1987, the station came under the control and operation of the Central Japan Railway Company.

Station numbering was introduced to the Minobu Line in March 2018; Iriyamase Station was assigned station number CC04.

Passenger statistics
In fiscal 2017, the station was used by an average of 448 passengers daily (boarding passengers only).

Surrounding area
Fujine Station is located in an industrial area with numerous paper mills and chemical plants.

See also
 List of railway stations in Japan

References

External links

 Stations of the Minobu Line

Railway stations in Shizuoka Prefecture
Railway stations in Japan opened in 1913
Minobu Line
Fuji, Shizuoka